Instrument Soundtrack is a 1999 album by American post-hardcore band Fugazi.

Background
It is a mainly instrumental soundtrack for the documentary (Instrument) about the band produced by the band and filmmaker Jem Cohen.

The soundtrack mostly consists of previously unreleased songs and studio outtakes culled from Fugazi's history to that point, as well as seven demo versions of songs from their proper albums (six from 1998's End Hits and one from 1993's In on the Kill Taker).

Of particular note is the song "I'm So Tired", a piano ballad played and sung by Ian MacKaye, which is a significant departure from Fugazi's usual post-hardcore sound.

"Shaken All Over" features the bassline of Johnny Kidd & the Pirates' "Shakin' All Over", as well as MacKaye briefly singing the chorus line with heavy dub echo.

The riff from "Lusty Scripps" was played in Fugazi's final live show, in the break between the main set and the encore.

Covers

"I'm So Tired" has been covered by Gengahr, Fog Lake, Jennylee, Ultimate Painting, Laura Stevenson, and Eddie Vedder. The song was also covered by Kiki and Herb in their 2016 cabaret show Kiki & Herb: Seeking Asylum! at Joe's Pub.

Track listing

Personnel
Fugazi
Ian MacKaye - guitar (1, 2, 5, 6, 8, 9, 15–18), keyboards (4), bass (11), piano (12), vocals (7, 10, 12, 17)
Guy Picciotto - guitar (1, 3, 6, 8, 10, 13–16, 18), clarinet (2, 7), drum machine & bass drum (3), bass & dehumidifier percussion (13), thumb piano (17), vocals (13, 17)
Joe Lally - bass (1, 2, 4–6, 8–10, 15, 16, 18)
Brendan Canty - drums (1–4, 6–12, 14–16, 18), guitar & bass (3, 14), melodica (5), vocals (17)

References

Fugazi soundtracks
1999 soundtrack albums
Documentary film soundtracks
Dischord Records soundtracks
Albums produced by Ian MacKaye